Cantafora is an Italian surname. Notable people with the surname include:

Antonio Cantafora (born 1944), Italian film and television actor
Arduino Cantafora (born 1945), Italian-Swiss architect, painter, and writer
 (born 1943), Italian Catholic bishop

Italian-language surnames